Eduardo García is a Mexican chef and founder of Mexico City restaurants Máximo Bistrot and Lalo! He is often considered one of Mexico's top chefs.

Biography
García began his love of cooking at the age of 8 when his parent moved to the United States as migrant farm workers and gave him the task of preparing simple food such as chicken soups and meat with vegetables.

García began his professional career in restaurants as a dishwasher in an Atlanta restaurant, working for Chef Scott Adair at the Purple Cactus Cafe. Chef Adair recognized his great talent and moved him to the kitchen. Chef Adair told him that he was like Escoffier recreated.  and at 16 moved onto Brasserie Le Coze in the same city, which had the same owners as Le Bernardin in New York. Later he moved to New York, where he met famous Mexican chef Enrique Olvera, owner of the restaurant Pujol in Mexico City. García returned to Mexico to work with Olvera for three years. It was during this period that he met his wife Gabriela. In December 2011 the couple opened Máximo Bistrot in the Colonia Roma district of Mexico City, which has since become a magnet for the city's hottest new restaurants. Máximo has since won numerous awards.

In 2013 García partnered with Japanese restaurant Rokai in Colonia Cuauhtémoc and created the menus for restaurants De Mar a Mar, Cine Tonalá and Puebla 109. In November 2014, the Garcías opened Lalo!, a restaurant designed to serve his creations at breakfast– and lunchtime at lower prices.

The Wall Street Journal characterized García as being known for "modernizing Mexico City's food scene with accessible, chic, hyper-seasonal dishes. Shining a spotlight on Mexico's bounty in an informal setting."

William Reed Business Media ranked Máximo Bistrot #41 of Latin America's 50 best restaurants of 2015.

Lady PROFECO scandal
On April 27, 2013, Andrea Benítez, the daughter of the head of Mexico's Office of the Federal Prosecutor for the Consumer (PROFECO), Humberto Benítez Treviño, was involved in a scandal about abuse of power. Andrea arrived at Máximo Bistrot without a reservation and got into an argument with Gabriela García, demanding to be seated. Gabriela refused, stating that there was a list of people with reservations and she would have to wait. Andrea threw a tantrum, filmed by witnesses and widely circulated in Mexico, and the public gave her the nickname "Lady PROFECO".

Andrea threatened Gabriela to close the restaurant, a power that PROFECO has. Indeed, later the same day, PROFECO inspectors closed the restaurant for what were widely seen as trumped-up reasons. Video of the incident went viral, exposing the Benítez family's abuse of power, resulting in widespread calls for her father to step down. The head of the PRD political party asked for his resignation shortly thereafter.

On May 15, 2013, the Secretary of the Interior, Miguel Ángel Osorio Chong, dismissed Benítez by order of President Enrique Peña Nieto, considering that the scandal damaged the image of government authority. The scandal and its aftermath represented a small but significant milestone in the fight for transparency in Mexico's political system.

References

Living people
Mexican chefs
Place of birth missing (living people)
Year of birth missing (living people)
Restaurant founders